Kovilan Point Lighthouse is a lighthouse on the island of Karaitivu in northern Sri Lanka. Built in 1916 (station was established in 1899), the  white lighthouse has a round masonry tower.

See also

 List of lighthouses in Sri Lanka

References

External links
 Sri Lanka Ports Authority 
 Lighthouses of Sri Lanka
 Picture of Kovilan Point Lighthouse 

Lighthouses completed in 1916
Lighthouses in Sri Lanka
Archaeological protected monuments in Jaffna District
Buildings and structures in Jaffna District